Montmagny is a city in the Montmagny Regional County Municipality within the Chaudière-Appalaches region of Quebec. It is the county seat and had a population, as of the Canada 2011 Census, of 11,491.

The city is on the south shore of the Saint Lawrence River, east of Quebec City, and was founded more than 350 years ago. It is Canada's Snow Goose Capital, and festivals include the International Accordion Festival in September and the Festival of the Snow Geese in October.

The city was named after Charles de Montmagny, the first to have the title of governor of New France. (Samuel de Champlain was commander in chief.)

Montmagny was the county seat of the former Montmagny County.

Location

Montmagny is northwest of the Notre Dame Mountains, more commonly but unofficially called the Canadian extension of the Green Mountains as they are called in New England. While Mont Notre Dame is the official name, the vast majority of people living in the area stretching from Quebec City to the Gaspé Peninsula refer to them as simply "the Appalachians" (French: les Appalaches), the origin of the official designation of the region comprising Quebec City's South Shore suburbia to the US border to the east and the northeast, which is known as Chaudière-Appalaches, after the mountains and the main river flowing down from them into the St. Lawrence River

The city of Montmagny itself is parted by the South River (French: Rivière du Sud), where a smaller river, Bras-Saint-Nicolas, merges into it. The confluence of waters swells into a set of falls, leading to discharge into the Saint-Lawrence a short distance west of the city.

Montmagny is the seat of the judicial district of Montmagny.

Demographics 

Economy

The industrial sector is the backbone of the economy. However, the city lost many jobs when Whirlpool closed its activities on May 13, 2004, incurring the loss of 600 jobs. The city has rebounded from that period. Textile industry has also made employment for decades. A post-secondary institution, The Centre d'études collégiales de Montmagny, a hospital, named Hôtel-Dieu de Montmagny, and a provincial jail are part of the economy.

Notable people
 Amable Bélanger, iron founder
 Sammy Blais, professional ice hockey left winger
 Gérard Bolduc, founder of the Quebec International Pee-Wee Hockey Tournament
 Alain Côté, ice and roller hockey player
 Sylvie Garant, model, Playboy Playmate of the Month for November 1979
 Étienne-Paschal Taché, twice Premier of the Province of Canada, President of the Quebec Conference, 1864, considered a Father of Confederation
 Emma Gaudreau Casgrain, first woman to be licensed as a dentist in Canada

Climate

See also

Related articles
 Zec de l'Oie-Blanche-de-Montmagny (ZEC)
 St. Lawrence River
 List of cities in Quebec

References

External links
City web site

 
Cities and towns in Quebec
1966 establishments in Quebec